There was no concept of "British history" in the 1500s, except that the word "British" was used to refer to the ancient Britons and the Welsh.

This page presents a timeline of events in the history of England and Scotland from 1500 until 1599.

1509 England – Henry VIII crowned and married to Catherine of Aragon
1513 England and Scotland – James IV and thousands of Scots killed in defeat at Flodden
1521 England – Lutheran writings begin to circulate.
1525 England – Henry VIII seeks an annulment of his marriage, which is refused.
1526 England – Cardinal Wolsey orders the burning of Lutheran books.
1529 England – Henry VIII severs ties with Rome and declares himself head of the English church.
1532 Scotland – Creation of the College of Justice and the Court of Session.
1534 England – Act of Supremacy passed by Henry VIII
1534 England – Treasons Act 1534
1535 England – Execution of Thomas More and Cardinal John Fisher.
1536 England – Execution of William Tindale in Antwerp
1542 Scotland – Mary, Queen of Scots, accedes to the Scottish throne
1547 England – Edward VI crowned King
1549 England – Prayer Book rebellion in south-west.
1553 England – Mary I accedes to the throne.
1558 England – Queen Elizabeth I accedes to the throne
1559 England – Act of Supremacy 1559
 Scotland – John Knox returns from Geneva to promote Calvinism.
1560:Scotland – Parliament legislates protestant reformation of the Church of Scotland.
1567 Scotland – The Catholic Mary, Queen of Scots, abdicates and flees Scotland after an uprising by Protestant lords
1571 England – Treasons Act 1571
1579 Scotland – James VI takes over government from his regent, James Douglas.
1582 Scotland –  Establishment of the University of Edinburgh by Royal Charter.
1587 England and Scotland – Execution of Mary, Queen of Scots, at Fotheringay Castle in Northamptonshire on 8 February
1588 England – Spanish Armada destroyed on 8 August
1592 Scotland – James VI enacts the "Golden Act" recognising the power of Presbyterianism within the Scottish church

See also 
 Timeline of British history
 Timeline of British history (1000-1499) 
 Timeline of British history (1600-1699)
 Early Modern Britain
 History of the British Isles
 History of England
 History of Ireland
 History of Northern Ireland
 History of Scotland
 History of Wales
 History of the United Kingdom

British history timelines